A fellowship is the period of medical training, in the United States and Canada, that a physician, dentist, or veterinarian may undertake after completing a specialty training program (residency). During this time (usually more than one year), the physician is known as a fellow. Fellows are capable of acting as an attending physician or a consultant physician in the specialist field in which they were trained, such as internal medicine or pediatrics. After completing a fellowship in the relevant sub-specialty, the physician is permitted to practice without direct supervision by other physicians in that sub-specialty, such as cardiology or oncology.

United States
In the US, the majority of fellowships are accredited by the Accreditation Council for Graduate Medical Education ("ACGME"). There are a few programs that are not accredited, yet are actually well received, given the importance of being a Board Certified Physician in a primary specialty, where a Fellowship is often more based on research productivity.

ACGME Fellowships
The following are organized based on specialty required for the fellowship.

Internal Medicine or Pediatrics
 Adolescent Medicine
 Allergy/Immunology
 Cardiology
 Child abuse (pediatrics only)
 Critical care medicine
 Emergency medicine
 Endocrinology
 Gastroenterology
 Hematology
 Infectious diseases
 Neonatology (pediatrics only)
 Nephrology
 Oncology
 Pulmonology
 Rheumatology

General Surgery

 Complex General Surgical Oncology
 Hand Surgery
 Pediatric Surgery
 Trauma, Burns, and Surgical Critical Care
 Vascular Surgery
 Colon and Rectal Surgery
 Thoracic Surgery
 Hospice and palliative medicine
 Plastic and Reconstructive Surgery
Non-ACGME Accredited Fellowships:
 Abdominal Transplant Surgery
 Hepatopancreatobiliary Surgery
 Advanced Gastrointestinal, Minimally Invasive, Foregut, and Bariatric Surgery
 Breast Surgery
 Endocrine Surgery

Neurology
 Vascular Neurology
 Endovascular Surgical Neuroradiology (Interventional Neurology, or Neurointerventional Radiology [NIR])
 Neurocritical Care
 Clinical Neurophysiology
 Neuroimmunology
 Neuro-oncology
 Neuro-ophthalmology
 Geriatric Neurology
 Headache Medicine
 Sleep Medicine
 Epilepsy
 Neurohospitalist
Neurorehabilitation

ObGyn

 Gynecologic Oncology
 Maternal Fetal Medicine
 Female Pelvic Medicine and Reconstructive Surgery
 Reproductive Endocrinology
 Minimally Invasive Gynecologic Surgery1
 Pediatric and Adolescent Gynecology1
1 Not officially recognized as a subspecialty by the American Board of Obstetrics/Gynecology or the American College of Obstetrics/Gynecologists.

Ophthalmology
 Cornea
 Glaucoma
 Medical retina
 Neuro-ophthalmology
 Oculoplastic and reconstructive surgery
 Oncology
 Pathology
 Pediatric
 Refractive
 Uveitis
 Vitreoretinal surgery

Psychiatry

 Addiction Medicine
 Addiction Psychiatry
 Brain Injury Medicine
 Child and Adolescent Psychiatry
 Consultation-Liaison Psychiatry
 Forensic Psychiatry
 Geriatric Psychiatry
 Headache Medicine
 Hospice and Palliative Medicine
 Sleep Medicine

Urology
 Pediatric
 Female Pelvic Medicine and Reconstructive Surgery
 Urologic Oncology
 Endourology

Orthopaedic
 Hand
 Sports Medicine
 Pediatrics
 Spine
 Foot and Ankle
 Joint replacement
 Trauma
 Oncology

Other
 Female Pelvic Medicine and Reconstructive Surgery
 Hematopathology
 Cytopathology
 Traumatologist
 Clinical Informatics (multiple specialties)
 Geriatrics
 Hospice and Palliative Medicine
 Interventional Radiology
 Sleep medicine (multiple specialties)
 Sports medicine (multiple specialties)
 Transplant hepatology

Requirements
In general, ACGME accredited programs require completion of ACGME-accredited, RCPSC-accredited or CFPC- accredited residency program, however, exceptions for an ACGME-International- accredited residency programs and non-ACGME-accredited residency programs are possible. International medical graduates must be ECFMG certified. Some fellowship specialties require participation in special matching programs like Specialties Matching Service® (SMS®) or SF Match.

Combined fellowships
There are a number of programs offering a combined fellowship, training in two or more sub-specialties as part of a single program. 
 Pulmonary/Critical Care: this type of program is more common than Pulmonary Disease (non-combination) programs.  As of 2007, there were 130 ACGME-accredited combined Pulmonary/Critical Care programs while only 25 programs for Pulmonary Disease alone.
 Hematology/Oncology: as of 2005, there were 125 ACGME-accredited programs for Hematology-Oncology, while only 12 programs for Hematology alone and 18 for Oncology alone.
 Geriatrics/Oncology: the American Board of Internal Medicine approved a 3-year combined fellowship training program in medical oncology and geriatrics.  The John A. Hartford Foundation initially funded 10 institutions for this type of training.

See also
 Medical intern
 Medical specialty
 Physician specialty codes
 Society of General Internal Medicine
 Residency (medicine)
 Attending physician

References

External links 
 General Internal Medicine Fellowship Directory  from the Society of General Internal Medicine (SGIM)

Medical education in the United States
Medical education in Canada